The Qmunity District is a gay neighborhood located in Downtown San Jose, California.

History 

The district was formally designated in 2020 by city and downtown leaders to create an LGBTQ district in Downtown San Jose. The location of the district was chosen due to its being an important center of gay life within the city and the Silicon Valley high-tech culture.

Culture
The district is home to a hub of gay bars, including the notable Splash Bar, one of San Jose's oldest.

Geography
The Qmunity District is located in Downtown San Jose. Its boundaries are made up of Post Street, between 1st Street and Market Street, and intersected by Lightston Alley.

References

External links
 Qmunity District website

Culture of San Jose, California
Neighborhoods in San Jose, California
Gay villages in California
Downtown San Jose